The Powder River Bridge is a bridge spanning the Powder River just above its confluence with the Yellowstone River in Prairie County, Montana.  It was added to the National Register of Historic Places on January 4, 2010.  It is a steel truss style bridge built in 1946.  The bridge is 633 feet in length consisting of a 203-foot main truss span and two 163-foot truss spans.

References
 

Road bridges on the National Register of Historic Places in Montana
Bridges completed in 1946
National Register of Historic Places in Prairie County, Montana
Steel bridges in the United States
Truss bridges in the United States
1946 establishments in Montana
Transportation in Prairie County, Montana